The Libertarian Party (LP) is a political party in the United States that promotes civil liberties, non-interventionism, laissez-faire capitalism, and limiting the size and scope of government. The party was conceived in August 1971 at meetings in the home of David F. Nolan in Westminster, Colorado, and was officially formed on December 11, 1971, in Colorado Springs, Colorado. The organizers of the party drew inspiration from the works and ideas of the prominent Austrian school economist, Murray Rothbard.  The founding of the party was prompted in part due to concerns about the Nixon administration, the Vietnam War, conscription, and the introduction of fiat money.

The party generally promotes a classical liberal platform, in contrast to the Democratic Party's modern liberalism and progressivism and the Republican Party's conservatism. Gary Johnson, the party's presidential nominee in 2012 and 2016, claims that the Libertarian Party is more culturally liberal than Democrats, and more fiscally conservative than Republicans. Its fiscal policy positions include lowering taxes, abolishing the Internal Revenue Service (IRS), decreasing the national debt, allowing people to opt out of Social Security and eliminating the welfare state, in part by utilizing private charities. Its cultural policy positions include ending the prohibition of illegal drugs, advocating criminal justice reform, supporting same-sex marriage, ending capital punishment, and supporting gun ownership rights.

 it is the third-largest political party in the United States by voter registration. In the 2020 election the Libertarians gained a seat in the Wyoming House of Representatives, giving them their first state legislative win since 2000.  there are 310 Libertarians holding elected office: 193 of them partisan offices and 117 of them non-partisan offices. There are 693,634 voters registered as Libertarian in the 31 states that report Libertarian registration statistics and Washington, D.C. The first electoral vote for a woman was that for Tonie Nathan of the party for vice president in the 1972 United States presidential election due to a faithless elector supporter who eschewed his expected votes for President Richard Nixon and Vice President Spiro Agnew in favor of the Libertarian ticket. The first and only Libertarian in Congress was Justin Amash, who joined the Libertarian Party in 2020 and left the U.S. House of Representatives in 2021 after choosing not to seek re-election.

History 

The first Libertarian National Convention was held in June 1972. In 1978, Dick Randolph of Alaska became the first elected Libertarian state legislator. Following the 1980 federal elections, the Libertarian Party assumed the title of being the third-largest party for the first time after the American Independent Party and the Conservative Party of New York (the other largest minor parties at the time) continued to decline. In 1994, over 40 Libertarians were elected or appointed which was a record for the party at that time. 1995 saw a soaring membership and voter registration for the party. In 1996, the Libertarian Party became the first third party to earn ballot status in all 50 states two presidential elections in a row. By the end of 2009, 146 Libertarians were holding elected offices.

Tonie Nathan, running as the Libertarian Party's vice presidential candidate in the 1972 presidential election with John Hospers as the presidential candidate, was the first female candidate in the United States to receive an electoral vote.

The 2012 election Libertarian Party presidential candidate, former New Mexico Governor Gary Johnson and his running mate, former judge Jim Gray, received the highest number of votes—more than 1.2 million—of any Libertarian presidential candidate at the time. He was renominated for president in 2016, this time choosing former Massachusetts Governor William Weld as his running mate. Johnson/Weld shattered the Libertarian record for a presidential ticket, earning over 4.4 million votes. Both Johnson and Green Party presidential candidate Jill Stein received significantly more news coverage in 2016 than third-party candidates usually get, with polls showing both candidates potentially increasing their support over the last election, especially among younger voters.

The Libertarian Party has had significant electoral success in the context of state legislatures and other local offices. Libertarians won four elections to the Alaska House of Representatives between 1978 and 1984 and another four to the New Hampshire General Court in 1992. Neil Randall, a Libertarian, won the election to the Vermont House of Representatives in 1998 running on both the Libertarian and Republican lines. In 2000, Steve Vaillancourt won election to the New Hampshire General Court running on the Libertarian ballot line. Rhode Island State Representative Daniel P. Gordon was expelled from the Republicans and joined the Libertarian Party in 2011. In July 2016 and June 2017, the Libertarians tied their 1992 peak of four legislators when four state legislators from four different states left the Republican Party to join the Libertarian Party: Nevada Assemblyman John Moore in January, Nebraska Senator Laura Ebke (although the Nebraska Legislature is officially non-partisan) and New Hampshire Representative Max Abramson in May and Utah Senator Mark B. Madsen in July. In the 2016 election cycle, Madsen and Abramson did not run for re-election to their respective offices while Moore lost his race after the Libertarian Party officially censured him over his support of taxpayer stadium funding. Ebke was not up for re-election in 2016. New Hampshire Representative Caleb Q. Dyer changed party affiliation to the Libertarian Party from the Republican Party in February 2017. New Hampshire Representative Joseph Stallcop changed party affiliation to the Libertarian Party from the Democratic Party in May 2017. New Hampshire State Legislator Brandon Phinney joined with the Libertarian Party from the Republican Party in June 2017, the third to do so in 2017 and matching their 1992 and 2016 peaks of sitting Libertarian state legislators.

In January 2018, sitting New Mexico Commissioner of Public Lands Aubrey Dunn Jr. changed party affiliation from Republican to the Libertarian Party, becoming the first Libertarian statewide officeholder in history.

In April 2020, Representative Justin Amash of Michigan became the first Libertarian member of Congress after leaving the Republican Party and spending time as an independent. In June 2020, Amash, with Ayanna Pressley of the Democratic Party, introduced the Ending Qualified Immunity Act in response to the murder of George Floyd by a Minneapolis police officer. The bill was the first to gain support of members from the Democratic, Republican and Libertarian parties in the history of the United States Congress.

Following the 2022 Libertarian National Convention, the Mises Caucus, a paleolibertarian faction, became the dominant faction on the Libertarian National Committee. In response, the New Mexico LP voted to disaffiliate, the Massachusetts LP split, and the Virginia LP dissolved itself.

The Dallas Accord
The Dallas Accord is an implicit agreement that was made at the 1974 Libertarian National Convention as a compromise between the larger minarchist and smaller anarcho-capitalist factions by adopting a platform that explicitly did not say whether it was desirable for the state to exist.

The purpose of this agreement was to make the Libertarian Party a "big tent" that would welcome more ideologically diverse groups of people interested in reducing the size of government. Consequently, the 1974 platform included a "Statement of Principles" which focused on statements arguing for getting government out of various activities, and used phrases such as "where governments exist they must not violate the rights of any individual." The previous version of the Statement of Principles adopted at the party's first convention in 1972, in contrast, affirmatively endorsed the minarchist perspective with statements such as "Since government has only one legitimate function, the protection of individual rights...." It was agreed that the topic of anarchism would not even be on the table for discussion until a limited government was achieved.

During the 2006 Libertarian National Convention delegates deleted a large portion of the very detailed platform. The phrase "Government exists to protect the rights of every individual including life, liberty and property" was added.  This development was described as the "Portland Massacre" by its opponents. Some took this as meaning the Dallas Accord was dead.

Whether the Dallas Accord remains in effect, and if so whether it should, or what limits it places on the party's public statements or candidates, all remain disputed within the party. The party's Statement of Principles also states support for "the prohibition of the initiation of physical force against others," and "the prohibition of robbery, trespass, fraud, and misrepresentation." The platform states in its Criminal Justice plank, that "[t]he prescribed role of government is to protect the rights of every individual including the right to life, liberty and property."

Name and symbols 

In 1972, "Libertarian Party" was chosen as the party's name, selected over "New Liberty Party". The first official slogan of the Libertarian Party was "There ain't no such thing as a free lunch" (abbreviated "TANSTAAFL"), a phrase popularized by Robert A. Heinlein in his 1966 novel The Moon Is a Harsh Mistress, sometimes dubbed "a manifesto for a libertarian revolution". The slogan of the party is "The Party of Principle".

Also in 1972, the "Libersign"—an arrow angling upward through the abbreviation "TANSTAAFL"—was adopted as a party symbol. By the end of the decade, this was replaced with the Lady Liberty until 2015, with the adoption of the "Torch Eagle" logo.

In the 1990s, several state Libertarian parties adopted the Liberty Penguin ("LP") as their official mascot. Another mascot is the Libertarian porcupine, an icon that was originally designed by Kevin Breen in March 2006 and inspired by the logo of the Free State Project (FSP).

Structure and composition 

The Libertarian Party is democratically governed by its members, with state affiliate parties each holding annual or biennial conventions at which delegates are elected to attend the party's biennial national convention. National convention delegates vote on changes to the party's national platform and bylaws and elect officers and "At-Large" representatives to the party's National Committee. The National Committee also has "Regional Representatives", some of whom are appointed by delegate caucuses at the national convention whereas others are appointed by the chairpersons of LP state affiliate chapters within a region.

Libertarian National Committee 
The Libertarian National Committee (LNC) is a 27-member body including alternates, or 17 voting members. Since the 2022 Libertarian National Convention, the chair has been Angela McArdle of California.

State chapters 
The Libertarian Party is organized in 48 states and the District of Columbia. Each state affiliate has a governing committee, usually consisting of statewide officers elected by state party members and regional representation of one kind or another. Similarly, county, town, city and ward committees, where organized, generally consist of members elected at the local level. State and local committees often coordinate campaign activities within their jurisdiction, oversee local conventions and in some cases primaries or caucuses and may have a role in nominating candidates for elected office under state law.

Membership 
Since the Libertarian Party's inception, individuals have been able to join the party as voting members by signing their agreement with the organization's membership pledge, which states that the signer does not advocate the initiation of force to achieve political or social goals. During the mid-1980s and into the early 1990s, this membership category was called an "instant" membership, but these are referred to as "signature members". People joining the party are also asked to pay dues, which are on a sliding scale starting at $25 per year. Lifetime membership is granted with a $1,500 donation in one calendar year. Dues-paying members receive a subscription to the party's national newspaper, LP News. Since 2006, membership in the party's state affiliates has been separate from membership in the national party, with each state chapter maintaining its own membership rolls.

Most rights to participate in the governance of the party are limited to "bylaws-sustaining members" who have either purchased a lifetime membership or donated at least $25 within the past year. Most state parties maintain separate membership, which may be tied to either payment of dues to the state party, or voter registration as a Libertarian, depending on the state's election laws.

Platform 
The preamble outlines the party's goals: "As Libertarians, we seek a world of liberty; a world in which all individuals are sovereign over their own lives and no one is forced to sacrifice his or her values for the benefit of others. [...] Our goal is nothing more nor less than a world set free in our lifetime, and it is to this end that we take these stands". Its Statement of Principles begins: "We, the members of the Libertarian Party, challenge the cult of the omnipotent state and defend the rights of the individual". The Statement of Principles is foundational to the ideology of the party and was created specifically to bind the party to certain core principles with a high parliamentary burden for any amendment.

The platform emphasizes individual liberty in personal and economic affairs, avoidance of "foreign entanglements" and military and economic intervention in other nations' affairs, and free trade and migration. The party opposes gun control. It calls for Constitutional limitations on government as well as the elimination of most state functions. It includes a "Self-determination" section which quotes from the Declaration of Independence and reads: "Whenever any form of government becomes destructive of individual liberty, it is the right of the people to alter or to abolish it, and to agree to such new governance as to them shall seem most likely to protect their liberty". It also includes an "Omissions" section which reads: "Our silence about any other particular government law, regulation, ordinance, directive, edict, control, regulatory agency, activity, or machination should not be construed to imply approval".

The party favors minimally regulated markets, a less powerful federal government, strong civil liberties (including LGBT rights, with the party supporting same-sex marriage), the liberalization of drug laws, separation of church and state, open immigration, non-interventionism and neutrality in diplomatic relations, free trade and free movement to all foreign countries and a more representative republic. In 2018, the Libertarian Party became the first in the United States to call for the decriminalization of sex work. The party since 2022 has no official stance on abortion.

The Statement of Principles was written by John Hospers. The Libertarian Party's bylaws specify that a 7/8ths supermajority of delegates is required to change the Statement of Principles. Any proposed platform plank found by the Judicial Committee to conflict with the Statement requires approval by a three-fourths supermajority of delegates. Early platform debates included at the second convention whether to support tax resistance and at the 1974 convention whether to support anarchism. In both cases, a compromise was reached.

Size and influence

Presidential candidate performance 

The first Libertarian presidential candidate, John Hospers, received one electoral vote in 1972 when Roger MacBride, a Virginia Republican faithless elector pledged to Richard Nixon, cast his ballot for the Libertarian ticket. His vote for Theodora ("Tonie") Nathan as vice president was the first electoral college vote ever to be cast for a woman in a United States presidential election. MacBride became the Libertarian presidential nominee himself in 1976. This was the last time that the Libertarian Party won an electoral vote until 44 years later, in the 2016 presidential election, when Texas Republican faithless elector Bill Greene, who was pledged to cast his vote for Donald Trump, instead cast his vote for Libertarian Party member, 1988 presidential nominee, and former Republican representative Ron Paul for president.

During the 2016 presidential election, Gary Johnson and vice presidential candidate Bill Weld received a record percentage of 3.3% of the popular vote (4,489,233 votes), getting 9.3% in New Mexico, where Johnson had previously been elected governor. In the 2012 presidential election, Johnson and running mate Jim Gray received 1,275,821 votes (1.0%).

House of Representatives results 

 Source:

Senate results 

Source:

Earning ballot status 
Historically, Libertarians have achieved 50-state ballot access for their presidential candidate five times: in 1980, 1992, 1996, (in 2000, L. Neil Smith was on the Arizona ballot instead of the nominee, Harry Browne) 2016, and have reached 50-state ballot access for the 2020 election.

In April 2012, the Libertarian Party of Nebraska successfully lobbied for a reform in ballot access with the new law requiring parties to requalify every four years instead of two. Following the 2012 election, the party gained automatic ballot status in 30 states.

Following the 2016 election, the party announced that it had achieved automatic ballot status in 37 or 38 states plus the District of Columbia.

Party supporters 
In the Libertarian Party, some donors are not necessarily "members" because the party since its founding in 1972 has defined a "member" as being someone who agrees with the party's membership statement. The precise language of this statement is found in the party Bylaws. As of the end of 2017, there were 138,815 Americans who were on record as having signed the membership statement. A survey by David Kirby and David Boaz found a minimum of 14 percent of American voters to have libertarian-leaning views.

There is another measure the party uses internally as well. Since its founding, the party has apportioned delegate seats to its national convention based on the number of members in each state who have paid minimum dues (with additional delegates given to state affiliates for good performance in winning more votes than normal for the party's presidential candidate). This is the most-used number by party activists. As of December 2017, the Libertarian Party reported that there were 14,445 donating members.

Historically, dues were $15 throughout the 1980s and in 1991 they were increased to $25. Between February 1, 2006, and the close of the 2006 Libertarian party convention on May 31, 2006, dues were set to $0. However, the change to $0 dues was controversial and was de facto reversed by the 2006 Libertarian National Convention in Portland, Oregon, at which the members re-established a basic $25 dues category (now called Sustaining membership) and further added a requirement that all National Committee officers must henceforth be at least sustaining members (which was not required prior to the convention).

Registered voters 
Ballot access expert and editor of Ballot Access News Richard Winger periodically compiles and analyzes voter registration statistics as reported by state voter agencies and he reports that as of early 2020 the party ranked third in voter registration nationally with 693,634 .

Libertarians in office 

Libertarians have had limited success in electing candidates at the state and local level. Since the party's creation, 10 Libertarians have been elected to state legislatures and some other state legislators have switched parties after being originally elected as Republicans or Democrats. The most recent Libertarian candidate elected to a state legislature was Marshall Burt to the Wyoming House of Representatives in 2020. The party elected multiple legislators in New Hampshire during the 1990s as well as in Alaska during the 1980s. One of the party's Alaska state legislators, Andre Marrou was nominated for vice president in 1988 and for president in 1992.

As of 2017, there were 168 Libertarians holding elected office: 58 of them partisan offices and 110 of them non-partisan offices. In addition, some party members, who were elected to public office on other party lines, explicitly retained their Libertarian Party membership and these include former Representative Ron Paul, who has repeatedly stated that he remains a life member of the Libertarian Party.

Previously, the party has had four sitting members of state legislatures. Laura Ebke served in the nonpartisan Nebraska Legislature and announced her switch from being a Republican to a Libertarian in 2016. Three members of the New Hampshire House of Representatives who were elected as either Republicans or Democrats in the 2016 election announced their switch to the Libertarian Party in 2017.

State Senator Mark B. Madsen of Utah announced his switch from Republican to Libertarian in 2016, but also did not seek re-election that year. State Representative Max Abramson of New Hampshire switched from Republican to Libertarian before running as the party's gubernatorial candidate in 2016 instead of seeking re-election. State Representative John Moore of Nevada briefly switched parties, but he was defeated for re-election in 2016.

Aubrey Dunn Jr., the New Mexico Commissioner of Public Lands, switched his voter registration from Republican to Libertarian in January 2018. In doing so, Dunn became the first official elected to a statewide partisan office to have Libertarian voter registration.

Best results in major races

United States Senate elections 
In 2020, Ricky Dale Harrington Jr. received 33% of the vote in a two-way race in Arkansas, the highest percentage ever for a Libertarian candidate in a Senate election. In 2016, Joe Miller received 29% of the vote in a four-way race in Alaska. In 2002, Michael Cloud received 18% of the vote in a three-way race in Massachusetts. In 2018, Gary Johnson received 15% of the vote in a three-way race in New Mexico.

United States House of Representatives elections 
In 2012, Joel Balam received 32% of the vote in a two-way race in Kansas's 3rd congressional district, the best ever for a Libertarian candidate in a House election. In 2022, Mike Kolls received 31% of the vote in a two-way race in Texas's 26th congressional district. In 1998, William Chipman received 28% of the vote in a two-way race in Mississippi's 2nd congressional district.

Gubernatorial elections 
In 1982, Dick Randolph received 15% of the vote in a four-way race in Alaska, the best ever for a Libertarian candidate in a gubernatorial election. In 2020, Donald Rainwater received 12% of the vote in a three-way race in Indiana. In 2002, Ed Thompson received 10% of the vote in a three-way race in Wisconsin.

Other statewide elections 
In 2012, Mike Fellows received 43% of the vote in a two-way race in Montana for clerk of the Montana Supreme Court, the best ever for a Libertarian candidate in a statewide election. In 2008, John Monds received 33% of the vote in a race in Georgia for Georgia Public Service Commission, joining William Strange (running for Texas Court of Criminal Appeals) that same year as the first Libertarians to ever to receive more than one million votes. Two later candidates for the same position, David Staples in 2012 and Eric Hoskins in 2016, received 34% and 33% of the vote, respectively.

State Senate elections 
In 2018, Laura Ebke received 44% of the vote in a non-partisan race in Nebraska's 32nd Legislative district in the Nebraska Legislature, the best ever for a Libertarian candidate in a state senate election. Also in 2018, Bobbi Hicks received 38% of the vote in a race in Arkansas's 10th Senate district in the Arkansas Senate, the best ever for a Libertarian candidate in a partisan state senate election. There have been 14 candidates elected to state senate who had a Libertarian and major party cross endorsement: 1 in New Hampshire in 1992, 6 in New Hampshire in 1994, 3 in New Hampshire in 1996, 1 in Oregon in 2014, 1 in Oregon in 2018, 1 in New York in 2019, and 1 in New York in 2020.

State House elections 
Libertarians have been elected as state representatives without a major party cross-endorsement six times: Dick Randolph in Alaska in 1978, Ken Fanning and Randolph again in Alaska in 1980, Andre Marrou in Alaska in 1984, Steve Vaillancourt in New Hampshire in 2000, and in 2020, Marshall Burt received 54% of the vote in a two-way race in Wyoming's 39th House district in the Wyoming House of Representatives. As of the end of 2020, there have also been 67 candidates elected with a Libertarian and a major party cross endorsement: 37 in New Hampshire in 1992, 5 in New Hampshire in 1994, 4 in New Hampshire in 1996, 1 in Vermont in 1998, 5 in Oregon in 2014, 4 in Oregon in 2018, 4 in Oregon in 2020, and 7 in New York in 2020.

2016 election 

A Monmouth University opinion poll conducted on March 24, 2016, found Libertarian candidate Gary Johnson in double digits with 11% against Donald Trump (34%) and Hillary Clinton (42%) in a three-way race while a CNN poll from July 16, 2016, found Johnson with a personal best 13% of the vote. To be included in any of the three main presidential debates, a candidate must be polling at least 15% in national polls.

Following Trump's win in the Indiana Republican primary, making him the presumptive Republican nominee, the Libertarian Party received a rise in attention. Between 7 pm on May 3 and 12 pm on May 4, the Libertarian Party received 99 new memberships and an increase in donors as well as a rise in Google searches of "Libertarian Party" and "Gary Johnson". On May 5, Mary Matalin, a longtime Republican political strategist, made news when she switched parties to become a registered Libertarian, expressing her dislike of Trump.

Several Republican elected officials publicly stated that were considering voting for the Libertarian Party ticket in 2016. That included 2012 Republican presidential nominee Mitt Romney. It had been a common question and concern that the Libertarian ticket will exclusively draw away votes from Donald Trump and not the Democratic ticket. In response, Libertarian 2016 nominee Gary Johnson noted that analysis of national polls shows more votes drawn from Hillary Clinton.

Johnson would go on to receive 3.3% of the nationwide popular vote, with his best performance (9.3%) coming in New Mexico, where he previously served as a two-term governor.

After the conclusion of the Electoral College in 2016, the Libertarian Party received one electoral college vote from a faithless elector in Texas. However, the party's 2016 nominee Gary Johnson did not receive the vote. The single faithless vote went instead to former Republican Congressman Ron Paul, who had rejoined the Libertarian Party in 2015. He is the first Libertarian to receive an electoral vote since 1972.

Politicians leaving their parties for the Libertarian Party 

After presidential candidate Donald Trump won Indiana's 2016 Republican primary, several Republican officeholders left the Party and changed their affiliation to the Libertarian Party. The first to do so was John Moore, a then-sitting Assemblyman in Nevada. Following the 2016 Nebraska State Legislative Session, state Senator Laura Ebke announced her displeasure with the Republican Party and announced she was registering as a Libertarian. After that, Mark B. Madsen, a Utah State Senator, switched from the Republican Party to the Libertarian Party. From February to June 2017, three New Hampshire State Representatives (Caleb Q. Dyer, Joseph Stallcop and Brandon Phinney) left the Republican and Democratic Parties and joined the Libertarian Party. In January 2018, New Mexico Commissioner of Public Lands Aubrey Dunn Jr. switched his party registration from Republican to Libertarian and subsequently announced he would run as the Libertarian nominee for the Senate election in New Mexico. Dunn was the first Libertarian in a partisan statewide office and was the highest ever official from the Libertarian Party until US Representative Justin Amash switched his party registration from independent to Libertarian on April 29, 2020. In December 2020, Maine House of Representatives member John Andrews changed his party registration to Libertarian after winning re-election as a Republican.

There have also been a number of politicians who joined the Libertarian Party, sometimes only briefly, after having left office, including former New Mexico Governor Gary Johnson, former Massachusetts Governor William Weld, former Rhode Island Governor Lincoln Chafee, former Alaska United States Senator Mike Gravel, former Georgia Congressman Bob Barr, and former Texas Congressman Ron Paul.

Presidential ballot access 
The Libertarian Party has placed a presidential candidate on the ballot in all 50 states, as well as D. C., six times: 1980, 1992, 1996, 2000, 2016, and 2020. That level of ballot access has only been achieved by a third-party candidate four other times (John Anderson in 1980, Lenora Fulani in 1988, and Ross Perot in 1992 and 1996.) Although the territory of Guam has no electoral votes, it began holding presidential preference elections in 1980. The Libertarian Party presidential candidate has appeared on the ballot in Guam in every election from 1980 through 2020, except for 2016. Anderson and Fulani were also on the ballot in Guam.

The following is a table comparison of ballot status for the Libertarian Party presidential nominee from 1972 to 2020. In some instances the candidate appeared on the ballot as an independent.

Political positions 

The Libertarian Party supports laissez-faire capitalism and the abolition of the modern welfare state. It adopts pro-civil liberties and pro-cultural liberal approaches to cultural and social issues. Paul H. Rubin, professor of law and economics at Emory University, believes that while liberal Democrats generally seek to control economic activities and conservative Republicans generally seek to control consumption activities such as sexual behavior, abortion and so on, the Libertarian Party is the largest political party in the United States that advocates few or no regulations in what he deems "social" and "economic" issues.

Economic issues 
The "poverty and welfare" issues page of the Libertarian Party's website says that it opposes regulation of capitalist economic institutions and advocates dismantling the entirety of the welfare state: We should eliminate the entire social welfare system. This includes eliminating food stamps, subsidized housing, and all the rest. Individuals who are unable to fully support themselves and their families through the job market must, once again, learn to rely on supportive family, church, community, or private charity to bridge the gap.According to the party platform: "The only proper role of government in the economic realm is to protect property rights, adjudicate disputes, and provide a legal framework in which voluntary trade is protected" (adopted May 2008).

The Libertarian Party believes government regulations in the form of minimum wage laws drive up the cost of employing additional workers. That is why Libertarians favor loosening minimum wage laws so that overall unemployment rate can be reduced and low-wage workers, unskilled workers, visa immigrants and those with limited education or job experience can find employment.

Education 
The party supports ending the public school system. The party's official platform states that education is best provided by the free market, achieving greater quality, accountability and efficiency with more diversity of school choice. Seeing the education of children as a parental responsibility, the party would give authority to parents to determine the education of their children at their expense without interference from government. This includes ending corporal punishment within public schools. Libertarians have expressed that parents should have control of and responsibility for all funds expended for their children's education.

Environment 

The Libertarian Party supports a clean and healthy environment and sensible use of natural resources, believing that private landowners and conservation groups have a vested interest in maintaining such natural resources. The party has also expressed that "governments, unlike private businesses, are unaccountable for such damage done to the environment and have a terrible track record when it comes to environmental protection". The party contends that the environment is best protected when individual rights pertaining to natural resources are clearly defined and enforced. The party also contends that free markets and property rights (implicitly without government intervention) will stimulate the technological innovations and behavioral changes required to protect the environment and ecosystem because environmental advocates and social pressure are the most effective means of changing public behavior.

Fiscal policies 

The Libertarian Party opposes all government intervention and regulation on wages, prices, rents, profits, production and interest rates and advocates the repeal of all laws banning or restricting the advertising of prices, products, or services. The party's recent platform calls for the repeal of the income tax, the abolition of the Internal Revenue Service and all federal programs and services, such as the Federal Reserve System. The party supports the passage of a Balanced Budget Amendment to the Constitution which they believe will significantly lower the national debt, provided that the budget is balanced preferably by cutting expenditures and not by raising taxes. Libertarians favor free-market banking, with unrestricted competition among banks and depository institutions of all types. The party also wants a halt to inflationary monetary policies and legal tender laws. While the party defends the right of individuals to form corporations, cooperatives and other types of companies, it opposes government subsidies to business, labor, or any other special interest.

Healthcare 
The Libertarian Party favors a free market health care system without government oversight, approval, regulation, or licensing. The party states that it "recognizes the freedom of individuals to determine the level of health insurance they want, the level of health care they want, the care providers they want, the medicines and treatments they will use and all other aspects of their medical care, including end-of-life decisions". They support the repeal of all social insurance policies such as Medicare and Medicaid and favor "consumer-driven health care". The Libertarian Party has been advocating for Americans' ability to purchase health insurance across state lines and medicine across international borders.

Immigration and trade agreements 
The Libertarian Party consistently lobbies for the removal of governmental impediments to free trade. This is because their platform states that "political freedom and escape from tyranny demand that individuals not be unreasonably constrained by government in the crossing of political boundaries". To promote economic freedom, they demand the unrestricted movement of humans as well as financial capital across national borders. However, the party encourages blocking immigration of those with violent backgrounds or violent intent.

Labor 
The Libertarian Party supports the repeal of all laws which impede the ability of any person to find employment while opposing government-fostered/forced retirement and heavy interference in the bargaining process. The party supports the right of free persons to associate or not associate in labor unions and believes that employers should have the right to recognize or refuse to recognize a union.

Retirement and Social Security 
The party believes that retirement planning is the responsibility of the individual, not the government. Libertarians would phase out the government-sponsored Social Security system and transition to a private voluntary system. The Libertarians feel that the proper and most effective source of help for the poor is the voluntary efforts of private groups and individuals, believing members of society will become more charitable and civil society will be strengthened as government reduces its activity in that realm.

Social issues 
The Libertarian Party supports the legalization of all victimless crimes, including drugs, pornography, prostitution, polygamy, and gambling, has always supported the removal of restrictions on homosexuality, opposes any kind of censorship and supports freedom of speech, and supports the right to keep and bear arms while opposing Federal capital punishment. The Libertarian Party's platform states: "Government does not have the authority to define, license or restrict personal relationships. Consenting adults should be free to choose their own sexual practices and personal relationships".

Abortion 

Libertarians have very different opinions on the issue, just like in the general public. Some, like the group Libertarians for Life, consider abortion to be an act of aggression against a child, therefore necessitating government intervention to prevent it. Others, like the group Pro-Choice Libertarians, consider denying a woman the right to choose abortion to be an act of aggression from the government against her. The party has nominated both anti-abortion and abortion rights candidates. Their 2012 and 2016 presidential nominee Gary Johnson and their 2020 nominee Jo Jorgensen are pro-choice, as were past presidential nominees other than 1988 nominee Ron Paul and 2008 nominee Bob Barr. The platform had been pro-choice from 1972 until May 2022 when the abortion plank was deleted.

Crime and capital punishment 

Shortly before the 2000 elections, the party released a "Libertarian Party Program on Crime" in which they criticize the failures of a recently proposed Omnibus Crime Bill, especially detailing how it expands the list of capital crimes. Denouncing Federal executions, they also describe how the party would increase and safeguard the rights of the accused in legal settings as well as limit the use of excessive force by police. Instead, criminal laws would be reduced to violations of the rights of others through either force or fraud with maximum restitution given to victims of the criminals or negligent persons. In 2016, the party expanded their platform to officially support the repeal of capital punishment.

Freedom of speech and censorship 
The Libertarian Party supports unrestricted freedom of speech and is opposed to any kind of censorship, as the party has full support for the First Amendment. The party describes the issue in its website: "We defend the rights of individuals to unrestricted freedom of speech, freedom of the press and the right of individuals to dissent from government itself. [...] We oppose any abridgment of the freedom of speech through government censorship, regulation or control of communications media". The party claims it is the only political party in the United States "with an explicit stand against censorship of computer communications in its platform".

Government reform 
The Libertarian Party favors election systems that are more representative of the electorate at the federal, state and local levels. The party platform calls for an end to any tax-financed subsidies to candidates or parties and the repeal of all laws which restrict voluntary financing of election campaigns. As a minor party, it opposes laws that effectively exclude alternative candidates and parties, deny ballot access, gerrymander districts, or deny the voters their right to consider all legitimate alternatives. Libertarians also promote the use of direct democracy through the referendum and recall processes.

LGBT issues 
The Libertarian Party advocates repealing all laws that control or prohibit homosexuality. According to the Libertarian Party's platform: "Sexual orientation, preference, gender, or gender identity should have no impact on the government's treatment of individuals, such as in marriage, child custody, adoption, immigration or military service laws".

Gay activist Richard Sincere has pointed to the longstanding support of gay rights by the party, which has supported same-sex marriage since its first platform was drafted in 1972 (40 years before the Democratic Party adopted same-sex marriage into their platform in 2012). Many LGBT political candidates have run for office on the Libertarian Party ticket and there have been numerous LGBT caucuses in the party, with the most active in recent years being the Outright Libertarians. With regard to non-discrimination laws protecting LGBT people, the party is more divided, with some Libertarians supporting such laws, and others opposing them on the grounds that they violate freedom of association.

In 2009, the Libertarian Party of Washington encouraged voters to approve Washington Referendum 71 that extended LGBT relationship rights. According to the party, withholding domestic partnership rights from same-sex couples is a violation of the Equal Protection Clause of the Constitution. In September 2010, in the light of the failure to repeal the "Don't Ask, Don't Tell" policy (which banned openly gay people from serving in the military) during the Obama administration, the Libertarian Party urged gay voters to stop supporting the Democratic Party and vote Libertarian instead. The policy was repealed at the end of 2010.

Pornography and prostitution 
The Libertarian Party views attempts by government to control obscenity or pornography as "an abridgment of liberty of expression" and opposes any government intervention to regulate it. According to former Libertarian National Committee chairman Mark Hinkle, "Federal anti-obscenity laws are unconstitutional in two ways. First, because the Constitution does not grant Congress any power to regulate or criminalize obscenity, and second, because the First Amendment guarantees the right of free speech". This also means that the party supports the legalization of prostitution. Many men and women with backgrounds in prostitution and activists for sex workers' rights, such as Norma Jean Almodovar and Starchild, have run for office on the Libertarian Party ticket or are active members of the party. Norma Jean Almodovar, a former officer with the Los Angeles Police Department and former call girl who authored the book From Cop to Call Girl about her experiences, ran on the Libertarian Party ticket for California lieutenant governor in 1986 and was actively supported by the party. Mark Hinkle described her as being the most able "of any Libertarian" "to generate publicity". The Massachusetts Libertarian Party was one of the few organizations to support a 1980s campaign to repeal prostitution laws.

Second and Fourth Amendment rights 
The Libertarian Party affirms an individual's right recognized by the Second Amendment to keep and bear arms and opposes the prosecution of individuals for exercising their rights of self-defense. The party opposes laws at any level of government requiring registration of or restricting the ownership, manufacture, or transfer or sale of firearms or ammunition. The Libertarian Party has also shown support in the past for the abolition of the Alcohol and Tobacco Tax and Trade Bureau and support for Constitutional carry.

The party also affirms an individual's right to privacy through reforms that would give back rights of the Fourth Amendment of the United States of America's Bill of Rights to the citizens. Often this coincides with a citizen's right against covert surveillance by the government of their privacy.

Foreign policy issues 

Libertarians generally prefer an attitude of mutual respect between all nations. Libertarians believe that free trade engenders positive international relationships. Libertarian candidates have promised to cut foreign aid and withdraw American troops from the Middle East and other areas throughout the world. It has also called for withdrawal from NATO.

The Libertarian Party opposed the 2011 military intervention in Libya and LP Chair Mark Hinkle in a statement described the position of the Libertarian Party: "President Obama's decision to order military attacks on Libya is only surprising to those who actually think he deserved the Nobel Peace Prize. He has now ordered bombing strikes in six different countries, adding Libya to Afghanistan, Iraq, Pakistan, Somalia, and Yemen."

Political status of Puerto Rico 

While the Libertarian Party has not taken an official stance on the political status of Puerto Rico, it did publish an article in which Bruce Majors—the party's 2012 candidate for the District of Columbia's at-large congressional district delegate election—expressed support to "put a referendum on the ballot" and "let residents decide whether they would like to be a state" and thereby give residents of Washington, D.C. and Puerto Rico greater control over their level of taxation.

Internal debates

"Radicalism" vs. "pragmatism" debate 
A longstanding debate within the party is one referred to by libertarians as the anarchist–minarchist debate. In 1974, anarchists and minarchists within the party agreed to officially take no position on whether or not government should exist at all and to not advocate either particular view. This agreement has become known as the Dallas Accord, having taken place at the party's convention that year in Dallas, Texas.

Libertarian members often cite the departure of Ed Crane (of the Cato Institute, a libertarian think tank) as a key turning point in the early party history. Crane (who in the 1970s had been the party's first executive director) and some of his allies resigned from the party in 1983 when their preferred candidates for national committee seats lost in the elections at the national convention. Others like Mary Ruwart say that despite this apparent victory of those favoring radicalism, the party has for decades been slowly moving away from those ideals.

In the mid-2000s, groups such as the Libertarian Party Reform Caucus generally advocated revising the party's platform, eliminating or altering the membership statement and focusing on a politics-oriented approach aimed at presenting libertarianism to voters in what they deemed a "less threatening" manner. LPRadicals emerged in response and was active at the 2008 and 2010 Libertarian National Conventions. In its most recent incarnation, the Libertarian Party Radical Caucus was founded with the stated goal to "support the re-radicalization of the LP."

At the 2016 Libertarian National Convention, the Radical Caucus endorsed Darryl W. Perry for President and Will Coley for Vice President, who respectively won 7% and 10% of the vote on the first ballot, both taking fourth place. Though not explicitly organized as such, most self-identified pragmatists or moderates supported the nomination of Gary Johnson for president and Bill Weld for vice president. Johnson and Weld were both nominated on the second ballot with a narrow majority after having both placed just shy of the required 50% on the first ballots. After the convention, the Libertarian Pragmatist Caucus ("LPC") was founded and organized with the goal "[t]o promote realistic, pragmatic, and practical libertarian candidates and solutions." LPC supported Nicholas Sarwark in his successful bid for re-election as Chair of the party's national committee at the 2018 convention in New Orleans.

Platform revision 
In 1999, a working group of leading Libertarian Party activists proposed to reformat and retire the platform to serve as a guide for legislative projects (its main purpose to that point) and create a series of custom platforms on issues for different purposes, including the needs of the growing number of Libertarians in office. The proposal was incorporated in a new party-wide strategic plan and a joint platform-program committee proposed a reformatted project platform that isolated talking points on issues, principles and solutions as well as an array of projects for adaptation. This platform, along with a short Summary for talking points, was approved in 2004. Confusion arose when prior to the 2006 convention there was a push to repeal or substantially rewrite the Platform, at the center of which were groups such as the Libertarian Reform Caucus. Their agenda was partially successful in that the platform was much shortened (going from 61 to 15 planks—11 new planks and 4 retained from the old platform) over the previous one.

Members differ as to the reasons why the changes were relatively more drastic than any platform actions at previous conventions. Some delegates voted for changes so the party could appeal to a wider audience, while others simply thought the entire document needed an overhaul. It was also pointed out that the text of the existing platform was not provided to the delegates, making many reluctant to vote to retain the planks when the existing language was not provided for review.

Not all party members approved of the changes, some believing them to be a setback to libertarianism and an abandonment of what they see as the most important purpose of the Libertarian Party.

At the 2008 Libertarian National Convention, the changes went even further with the approval of an entirely revamped platform. Much of the new platform recycles language from pre-millennial platforms. While the planks were renamed, most address ideas found in earlier platforms and run no longer than three to four sentences.

Free State Project vs. Libertarian Party Debate

Proponents of the Free State Project, a movement dedicated to concentrating libertarians in the state of New Hampshire, argue that the Libertarian Party strategy of a national victory has been proven ineffective in stark contrast to libertarian concentration and focus on local races in New Hampshire. The founder of the Free State movement, Jason Sorens stated in the movement's announcement, "Partisan politics has clearly failed: Libertarian presidential candidates consistently fail to break the one per cent barrier, while no Libertarian candidate has ever won election to a federal office." 

At Porcfest 2021, an annual libertarian festival held in New Hampshire,  Executive Director of the Free State Project, Jeremy Kauffman and chair of the Libertarian Party Angela McArdle debated which strategy is more effective. Kauffman argued that, "There are more people in this room that are elected members to the NH House of Representatives and former members of the Libertarian Party than there are Libertarian Party members nationwide." Meanwhile, Angela McArdle argued that while she wants to see the Free State Project succeed, she argues that the Free State Project could not have existed without the political infrastructure provided by the LP developed over the course of five decades.

State and territorial parties 

 Libertarian Party of Alabama
 Libertarian Party of Alaska
 Libertarian Party of Arizona
 Libertarian Party of Arkansas
 Libertarian Party of California
 Libertarian Party of Colorado
 Libertarian Party of Connecticut
 Libertarian Party of Delaware
 Libertarian Party of Florida
 Libertarian Party of Georgia
 Libertarian Party of Hawaii
 Libertarian Party of Idaho
 Libertarian Party of Illinois
 Libertarian Party of Indiana
 Libertarian Party of Iowa
 Libertarian Party of Kansas
 Libertarian Party of Kentucky
 Libertarian Party of Louisiana
 Libertarian Party of Maine
 Libertarian Party of Maryland
 Libertarian Party of Massachusetts
 Libertarian Party of Michigan
 Libertarian Party of Minnesota
 Libertarian Party of Mississippi
 Libertarian Party of Missouri
 Montana Libertarian Party
 Libertarian Party of Nebraska

 Libertarian Party of Nevada
 Libertarian Party of New Hampshire
 Libertarian Party of New Jersey
 Libertarian Party of New York
 Libertarian Party of North Carolina
 Libertarian Party of North Dakota
 Libertarian Party of Ohio
 Libertarian Party of Oklahoma
 Libertarian Party of Oregon
 Libertarian Party of Pennsylvania
 Libertarian Party of Rhode Island
 Libertarian Party of South Carolina
 Libertarian Party of South Dakota
 Libertarian Party of Tennessee
 Libertarian Party of Texas
 Libertarian Party of Utah
 Libertarian Party of Vermont
 Libertarian Party of Washington
 Libertarian Party of West Virginia
 Libertarian Party of Wisconsin
 Libertarian Party of Wyoming
 Libertarian Party of the District of Columbia
Former affiliates
 Libertarian Association of Massachusetts
 Libertarian Party of New Mexico
 Libertarian Party of Virginia

See also 

 Factions of the U.S. Libertarian Party
 Free State Project
 Libertarianism in the United States
 Libertarian National Committee
 Libertarian National Convention
 List of libertarian organizations
 List of libertarian political parties
 List of libertarians in the United States
 List of political parties in the United States
 List of state affiliates of the U.S. Libertarian Party
 LPRadicals
 Mises Caucus
 Political parties in the United States
 Political party strength in U.S. states
 Right-libertarianism
 Third parties in the United States

Notes

References

Further reading

External links 

 
 

 
Libertarian parties in the United States
Non-interventionist parties
Political parties established in 1971
Political parties in the United States